"Cross Game" is the 14th maxi single by Alice Nine. It was released on December 10, 2008 in two versions: the first version includes a DVD with a music video and a random photocard of one of the band members, and the second version features only the CD while including a bonus track. The title track was the second ending theme for the TV Tokyo animation series Yu-Gi-Oh! 5D's.

Track listing

Version 1 (CD and DVD)
"Cross Game"
"[atmosphere]"
"Cross Game" music video

Version 2 (CD only)
"Cross Game"
"[atmosphere]"
"Mugen -electric eden-" ( -electric eden-)

References

External links
 King Records' Official Website
 Official myspace

2008 singles
Yu-Gi-Oh!
Alice Nine songs
2008 songs
King Records (Japan) singles
Song articles with missing songwriters